Charles Gordon, 1st Earl of Aboyne (c1638 - March 1681). The fourth son of George Gordon, 2nd Marquess of Huntly and Lady Anne Campbell, he was created 1st Earl of Aboyne and 1st Lord Gordon of Strathaven and Glenlivet by Letters Patent on 10 September 1660. At the time of his death in March 1681, he was succeeded in the earldom and lordship by his son.

Family
He married firstly, Margaret Irvine, daughter of Alexander Irvine, c1662, and had issue:
Lady Ann Gordon (d. c1665)

His first wife died in 1662.

He married secondly, Elizabeth Lyon, daughter of John Lyon, 2nd Earl of Kinghorne and Lady Elizabeth Maule, on 28 August 1665, and had issue:
Charles Gordon, 2nd Earl of Aboyne (c1670-1702)
Hon. George Gordon
Hon. John Gordon (d.1762)
Lady Elizabeth Gordon, married John Mackenzie, 2nd Earl of Cromartie (1685)

References
Kidd, Charles, Williamson, David (editors). Debrett's Peerage and Baronetage (2003 edition). London: Pan Macmillan, 2003., 

Cracroft's Peerage

1638 births
1681 deaths
Earls of Aboyne
17th-century Scottish peers
Peers of Scotland created by Charles II
Younger sons of marquesses